Ciimnuai was the legendary city-state of Zomi, who are mostly referred to as Chins in Myanmar, Mizo, Kuki in India, and Bawmzo in Bangladesh. Being their birthplace, Ciimnuai bears many accounts of myths and legends of Zomi. Carey and Tuck even called the city "Eden of the Chins".

According to tradition, it is located about two and half miles southwest from present Tedim and is in the precinct of present Saizang village. Traditions ascribe the founding of the city to Guite family, the then ruling house. Some of its remainings can still be collected at the site. However, some contemporary local historians contend that this current site might not be the only Ciimnuai that bears such numerous myths and stories, proposing that there might still be other Ciimnuais outside of present Chin Hills. If it is the case, the Ciimnuai at this current site must be a later Ciimnuai that adopted the name of the former. Moreover, even at the present site, several oral histories and traditions indicate that there are at least two different encampments (or settlements) occurred there and there’re at least four generations gone in between. Some of those commemorative songs and poetic sayings are as follow.

Concerning the first settlement:
Mang ii tusuan kil bang khang ing, zang a pehsik gawm ing, ka kiim a mi siah seu in kai ing,
Ka khua Ciimtui tungah ka vang kammei awi sang sa zaw e. [Guimang I, c. 1050 CE]
(Translation):
I the royal heir has come up (or grown) thus far, collecting those irons and coppers from the plain as well as collecting taxes and tributes from around,
My fame and glory might shine now, like the burning of my fireplace. [Guimang I, c. 1050 CE]

Nih thum siik in gua bang hing ing, ka zua thakiat nua’n ah e, Ka vang khuakiim ah azam hi;
Mang aw lun aw kawi aw, gal in don ve aw, Ciimkhua ka zahzawl ah, laizomte’n neek in huai e. [Mangsuum I, c. 1250 CE]
(Translation):
Stepping two, three mountains under my feet firmly, I’ve come this much after his majesty daddy left, my fame and glory grow everywhere;
O! Behold, all lords, princes, and also my love, that my siblings never miss to come and share their meals at my Cimmnuai residence. [Mangsuum I, c. 1250 CE)

Local sayings concerning later settlement by Tomcil (fifth generation from Guimang I through his youngest son called Naksau or Kullai):
Ami mawl lawmlawm, Tomcil mawl lawmlawm,
Azi Seldal hi leng, Lentang sat pungpung va’ng.
(Translation):
How much is fool Lord Tomcil, O! so fool is he;
If I were his mistress Seldal, I’d beat mountaintop of Lentang thump thump!

Ciimnuai Hausa bangin Sialsiah deih in, Khuakuah ngen!
(Translation):
Like to Lord of Ciimnuai, ask Khuakuah to win Sialsiah!

Footnotes

See also
Zomia
Guite
Vangteh
Tedim
Zomi
Chin

References
Carey, Bertram S. and Henry N. Tuck. The Chin Hills: A History of the People, Our Dealings with Them, Their Customs and Manners, and a Gazetteer of Their Country. Rangoon, Burma: Government Printing, 1896.
Goswami, M. C. & H. Kamkhenthang. ‘Clan Among the Paite.’ In Bulletin of the Department of Anthropology, Vol. IV. Guahati University, 1975: 22.
Khai, Sing K. Zo People and Their Culture. Lamka, Churachandpur, India: Khampu Hatzaw, 1995.
Sinha, Surajit. Tribal Polities and State Systems in Pre-Colonial Eastern and North Eastern India. Culcutta, India: Centre for Studies in Social Sciences, K. P. Bagchi & Co., 1987.
Zam, Ngul Lian (Guite), B.A. Mualthum Kampau Guite Hausate Tangthu (Chronicle of Guite Chiefs the Sovereign Lord of Three Mountain Regions). Amazon/CreateSpace, United States, 2018, .

Mythological populated places
Geography of Myanmar